Veyalochnaya (Yelgärgestär) is a rural locality (a village) in Angasyakovsky Selsoviet, Dyurtyulinsky District, Bashkortostan, Russia. The population was 189 as of 2010. There are 7 streets.

Geography 
Veyalochnaya is located 16 km north of Dyurtyuli (the district's administrative centre) by road. Novobiktovo is the nearest rural locality.

References 

Rural localities in Dyurtyulinsky District